The Sussex Police and Crime Commissioner is the police and crime commissioner, an elected official tasked with setting out the way crime is tackled by Sussex Police in the English County of Sussex.  The post was created on 21 November 2012, following an election held on 15 November 2012, and replaced the Sussex Police Authority. The current commissioner is Conservative Party politician Katy Bourne, who was re-elected in May 2016. The police and crime commissioner is required to produce a strategic Sussex Police and Crime Plan, setting out the priorities for Sussex Police, and their work is scrutinised by the Sussex Police and Crime Panel.

The post was the first to be elected on a Sussex-wide basis since 1832 when the Sussex parliamentary constituency was replaced by constituencies for Sussex's eastern and western divisions.

List of Sussex Police and Crime Commissioners

Elections
The Police and Crime Commissioner is elected by the supplementary vote method for a fixed term of four years, although the inaugural term of the post was for three and a half years.

2021

2016
Katy Bourne won re-election only after second preference votes were counted, with Michael Jones coming second.  Voter turnout was higher than in 2012 at 22.6 per cent.  The central count was held at the East Sussex National Golf Course near Uckfield.

2012
The inaugural election took place on 21 November 2012 and was won by Katy Bourne.  Voter turnout was 15.8 per cent.

See also
 Sussex Police
 History of local government in Sussex

References

External links

Sussex
Police and crime commissioners in England